Eucamptognathus satelles is a species of ground beetle in the subfamily Pterostichinae. It was described by Tschitscherine in 1903.

References

Eucamptognathus
Beetles described in 1903